Narmada may refer to:
 Narmada River of central India
 Narmada district of Gujarat, India
 The Narmada Dam Project, involving the construction of a series of large irrigation and hydroelectric multi purpose dams on the Narmada River in India
 Narmada Bachao Andolan, a social movement against the Sardar Sarovar Dam being built across the Narmada river
also refers to Indian girl names which means 'One who arouses tender feelings in others' narm literally means 'tender'
 Narmada (Maoist), a former member of the Central Committee of Communist Party of India (Maoist)
 Gujarat Narmada Valley Fertilisers